Gis Gelati was an Italian professional cycling team that was active between 1978 and 1991. It was headquartered in Giulianova, Abruzzo.

History

The team had a multitude of team managers, but the first was Piero Pieroni, who stayed for a total of three straight years and then came back for another season in 1984. In the team's first season, 1978, they won two events with Marino Basso. They won the 1983 Giro d'Italia with Francesco Moser. The team was very successful in the Giro d'Italia, they won many Points classifications, a General classification, and 23 stages. The team won a few classics due to the help of Roger De Vlaeminck and Francesco Moser. The team folded in 1991.

Notable riders

 Giuseppe Saronni 
 Roger De Vlaeminck 
 Francesco Moser 
 Johan van der Velde 
 Adriano Baffi 
 Dave Akam

Major wins

Major one-day races
Milan–San Remo
1979 Roger De Vlaeminck 
1984 Francesco Moser 
Omloop Het Volk
1979 Roger De Vlaeminck

Grand Tours

Giro d'Italia
General classification:
 1984 Francesco Moser 
Points classification:
1980 - Giuseppe Saronni 
1981 - Giuseppe Saronni 
1987 - Johan van der Velde 
1988 - Johan van der Velde 
Young rider classification:
1986 - Marco Giovannetti 
23 stages (3 in 1979, 7 in 1980, 3 in 1981, 1 in 1983, 4 in 1984, 3 in 1985, 2 in 1987, and 1 in 1991)

Vuelta a España
4 stages (4 in 1984)

Other races
2 stages in the Tirreno–Adriatico (in 1988)
1 stage in the Tour de Romandie (2 in 1981)

References

Cycling teams based in Italy
Defunct cycling teams based in Italy
Cycling teams established in 1978
Cycling teams disestablished in 1991